The International Recovery Platform (IRP) is a joint initiative of United Nations agencies, international financial institutions, national and local governments, and non-governmental organizations engaged in disaster recovery. IRP was founded in 2005. It came after the Second World Conference on Disaster Reduction, to support implementation of the Hyogo Framework for Action (HFA). The group works to identify and address gaps in recovery knowledge, practice and constraints. In 2015, IRP aligned its work to support implementation of the newly adopted Sendai Framework for Disaster Risk Reduction. It concentrated on Priority Four – building back better in recovery, rehabilitation and reconstruction.

The International Recovery Platform is led by its 17-member Steering Committee, and is coordinated by a secretariat based in Kobe, Japan.

IRP Steering Committee 
The International Recovery Platform is a partnership composed of, and led by its Steering Committee. The 17 IRP Steering Committee members are: 

 Asian Development Bank (ADB)
 Asian Disaster Reduction Center (ADRC)
 Cabinet Office, Government of Japan
 Centro de Coordinación para la Prevención de los Desastres Naturales en America Central, Punto Focal Regiona (CEPREDENAC)
 Hyogo Prefectural Government, Japan
 International Labour Organization (ILO)
 Ministry of Foreign Affairs, Italy
 Swiss Agency for Development and Cooperation (SDC)
 The World Bank
 UN Environment
 United Nations Centre for Regional Development (UNCRD)
 United Nations Development Programme (UNDP)
 United Nations Educational, Scientific and Cultural Organization (UNESCO)
 United Nations Human Settlements Programme (UN-HABITAT)
 United Nations Office for Disaster Risk Reduction (UNDRR)
 United Nations Office for Project Services (UNOPS)
 World Health Organization (WHO)

Areas of work

International Recovery Forum 
The International Recovery Forum is an annual conference organized by IRP in Kobe, Japan every January. The IRP Forum convenes senior policy makers and practitioners to exchange experiences and facilitate discussion on challenges to resilient recovery, and opportunities for rebuilding. 

 2020 Building Back Better through Resilient Infrastructure
 2019 Attaining the Build Back Better Dividend
 2018 Build Back Better in Urban Resilience
 2017 Build Back Better Towards Resilient and Healthy Communities
 2016 Sending the Message of Build Back Better from Hyogo, Japan
 2015 Sending the Message of Building Back Better from Hyogo, Japan
 2014 The Role of Private Sector in Disaster Recovery
 2013 Resilient Recovery in Cities and Municipalities: Lessons on Integrating DRR into Recovery and Development Planning-Tohoku and Global Experiences and the Post 2015 Framework for DRR
 2012 Regional Cooperation for Resilient Recovery
 2011 Pre-Disaster Recovery Planning for Building Back Better
 2010 From Resilient Recovery to Sustainable Development
 2009 Building Back Better and Greener -Engaging Partners for Environmentally Sound Recovery
 2008 Capacity Development for Better Recovery
 2007 Progress of the Implementation of the Hyogo Framework for Action and Recovery from Tsunami and Earthquake
 2006 1st Anniversary of the International Recovery Platform
 2006 Lesson on Recovery Learned from Recent Major Disasters
 2005 International Seminar on Post Disaster Recovery

Guidance Notes on Recovery 
In 2010, the International Recovery Platform launched the Guidance Notes on Recovery series. The Guidance Notes were conceived to respond to a need for practical resources that can support recovery planners, decision-makers, and implementers with good practices and lessons gleaned from past recovery efforts. Since the inception of the series, IRP has issued a total thirteen volumes, organized by sectors and key themes in recovery.

 Health Supplementary Edition (2017)
 Private Sector (2016)
 Pre-Disaster Recovery Planning (2012)
 Climate Change (2010)
 Environment (2010)
 Governance (2010)
 Health (2010)
 Infrastructure (2010)
 Livelihoods (2010)
 Psychosocial (2010)
 Shelter (2010)
 Telling Live Lessons (2010)

References

United Nations coalitions and unofficial groups
Disaster recovery